Luciano Caldas Bivar (born 29 November 1944) is a Brazilian politician and businessman who was the PSL candidate for the 2006 Brazilian general election. His political platform included projects such as the end of income tax in favour of a unique tax on products and services, and building military barracks in Brazilian favelas. He received 0.06% of the total vote in the first round and did not progress to the second round.

Born in Recife, Bivar was the president of Sport Club do Recife from 1989 to 1990, from 1997 to 2001, from 2005 to 2006, and in 2013.

References

|-

|-

|-

|-

|-

1944 births
Living people
Politicians from Recife
Brazilian football chairmen and investors
Candidates for President of Brazil
Social Liberal Party (Brazil) politicians
Brazil Union politicians
Right-wing populism in South America